Margaret Jane Wray is an American dramatic soprano known for her interpretations of the works of Richard Wagner.

Wray began her career as a member of the Metropolitan Opera's Young Artist program in the mid to late 1980s. She made her debut with the company in 1987 as Annina in Verdi's La Traviata. Wray was quickly identified as one of the most talented young artists in the field and success soon followed. In 1989, Wray was awarded the Richard Tucker Award. Wray went on to appear in lead roles with many of the world's leading opera companies including the Metropolitan Opera, Pittsburgh Opera, Cincinnati Opera, Seattle Opera, La Scala, the Bavarian State Opera, the Berlin State Opera, Opéra National de Paris, La Monnaie, L’Opéra de la Bastille, Oper Frankfurt, Teatro Regio (Turin), Théâtre du Capitole, Teatro Massimo Bellini, Opéra de Nice, and Welsh National Opera among others. Wray has also had a prolific career as a concert artist appearing with many of the world's finest conductors including Daniel Barenboim, Mariss Jansons, Seiji Ozawa, Kwun Chung and James Conlon. She has also performed with many of the world's great orchestras including the New York Philharmonic, Boston Symphony Orchestra, Chicago Symphony and National Symphony Orchestra among others.

Roles

 Amneris, Aida (Verdi)
 Chrysothemis, Elektra (Richard Strauss)
 Countess Almaviva, Le nozze di Figaro (Mozart)
 Desdemona, Otello (Verdi)
 Donna Elvira, Don Giovanni (Mozart)
 Elisabeth, Tannhäuser (Wagner)
 Elsa, Lohengrin (Wagner)
 Eva, Die Meistersinger von Nürnberg (Wagner)
 Gutrune, Götterdämmerung (Wagner)

 Leonore, Fidelio (Beethoven)
 Mme. Lidoine, Dialogues des Carmélites (Poulenc)
 Ortrud, Lohengrin (Wagner)
 Sieglinde, Die Walküre (Wagner)
 Senta, Der fliegende Holländer (Wagner)
 Sister Helen Prejean, Dead Man Walking (Jake Heggie)
 Third Norn, Götterdämmerung (Wagner)

References

Living people
American operatic sopranos
Richard Tucker Award winners
Year of birth missing (living people)
20th-century American women opera singers
21st-century American women opera singers